Jess Liaudin (born 21 December 1973) is a retired French professional mixed martial artist, kickboxer and film actor. A professional MMA competitor from 1990 until 2014, he competed for UFC, Pancrase, Cage Rage, and King of the Cage.

Background
Liaudin trained in martial arts from eight years old; in karate initially and then moving on to kickboxing. From the age of 16, he has been fighting in a variety of full-contact competitions. He has fought in over 84 amateur and professional fights in mixed martial arts, Muay Thai, and kickboxing.

Mixed martial arts career

Early career
Liaudin began his professional MMA career in 2000 as a Middleweight, compiling a 6–0 record before facing his first defeat. After a

Ultimate Fighting Championship
Liaudin signed to the UFC upon the heels of a three-fight winning streak, facing Dennis Siver at UFC 70. In arguably the most significant win of his career, Liaudin defeated Siver via first-round armbar just 1:21 into the fight.

After another first-round stoppage via TKO over Anthony Torres at UFC 75, Liaudin was scheduled to face Anthony Johnson at UFC 80. However, the bout was scrapped due to a hand injury Johnson suffered during training, and Liaudin instead returned at UFC 85 against Marcus Davis. Liaudin was knocked out in the first round.

After dropping a split decision to Paul Taylor at UFC 85, Liaudin then returned to the Lightweight division, facing David Bielkheden at UFC 89. Liaudin lost via unanimous decision, and was subsequently released from the promotion.

Post-UFC
Liaudin had a successful remainder of his career after the UFC, winning his final six fights.

Filmography
1997, Coca-Cola (TV commercial), Medieval sword fight/special action performer
1997, The Imax Nutcracker/Sands Films, Toy & Mouse (stunt)
2010, "Six degrees/Short Film", Tattoo artist
2010, "South Central/Day I Die" (Clip video), (Stunt)
2010, The Perpetrators/Dutiful Films ltd, Camou
2010, For Kai/SnowPix Productions, "Mr Ashbeck"
2011, The Sweeney, Pool Hall Bouncer
2011, Snow white and the Huntsman,  "The shadow army/special action performer"
2011, Le Mentor de "Jean-Pierre Mocky", Le Bonimenteur
2011, Four of a Kind/Short Film – Offkey Production, The Holiday maker
2011, Different Perspectives – Brainbox Films & Red Clover Productions, Matheus
2011, Ivryse – "Line up the stars" (Clip video)/ Davey inc, Russian gangster
2012, Thor: The Dark World, Stunt performer
2014, The Albion Falls/Short film, Jonah
2015, A hitman in London/Raging Pictures(Skin Traffik), Sergei's Associate
2015, The Squad, Waked
2016, Exterminatus/Short Film, Judge Garrat
2016, Night Fare, the driver
2018, Submergence, Marcel
2018, Holmes and Watson, The executioner
2018, Big Brother/Bullet Films, David Jones
2019, Anna, EuropaCorp, Olga's technician
2022, Irma Vep, TV miniseries, Satanas
Other work: The Bill/Talkback Thames,Streetdance 2 3D,B Monkey, Elephant juice.

Championships
 Welterweight World Title 77 kg- 10th Legion C F (2009)
 Shootboxing Japan "S-of the world vol 5" Winner (2003)
 European Cage Combat Middleweight Champion (2003)
 Knock Down Sport Budo International Champion (2001)
 European Brazilian jiu-jitsu & Grappling Championship (Fr) silver (2001)
 UK Open Sambo Tournament Silver medalist (2001)
 Long beach – World no gi (2007) Bronze medal
 South East USA Kickboxing Champion (11/21/93)

Mixed martial arts record

|-
| Win
| align=center| 20–11
| Juan Manuel Suarez
| TKO (punches)
| Tenth Legion: Victorious
| 
| align=center| 2
| align=center| 4:51
| London, England
| 
|-
| Win
| align=center| 19–11
| Rafael Silva
| Decision (unanimous)
| 10th Legion VII: Invasion of Warriors
| 
| align=center| 3
| align=center| 5:00
| London, England
| 
|-
| Win
| align=center| 18–11
| Manu Garcia
| Submission (guillotine choke)
| 100% Fight 2
| 
| align=center| 1
| align=center| 0:30
| Paris, France
| 
|-
| Win
| align=center| 17–11
| Bernueng Sakhomsin
| Submission (armbar)
| KMMA: MMA & Muay Thai Grand Extreme
| 
| align=center| 3
| align=center| 5:00
| Macau, China
| 
|-
| Win
| align=center| 16–11
| Lee Doski
| Decision (unanimous)
| ASF 4
| 
| align=center| 3
| align=center| 5:00
| Paris, France
| 
|-
| Win
| align=center| 15–11
| Peter Irving
| TKO (punches)
| 10th Legion: The War Machine
| 
| align=center| 1
| align=center| 4:06
| Hull, England
| 
|-
| Loss
| align=center| 14–11
| David Bielkheden
| Decision (unanimous)
| UFC 89
| 
| align=center| 3
| align=center| 5:00
| Birmingham, England
|Return to Lightweight.
|-
| Loss
| align=center| 14–10
| Paul Taylor
| Decision (split)
| UFC 85
| 
| align=center| 3
| align=center| 5:00
| London, England
| 
|-
| Loss
| align=center| 14–9
| Marcus Davis
| KO (punch)
| UFC 80
| 
| align=center| 1
| align=center| 1:04
| Newcastle, England
| 
|-
| Win
| align=center| 14–8
| Anthony Torres
| TKO (punches)
| UFC 75
| 
| align=center| 1
| align=center| 4:10
| London, England
| 
|-
| Win
| align=center| 13–8
| Dennis Siver
| Submission (armbar)
| UFC 70
| 
| align=center| 1
| align=center| 1:21
| Manchester, England
| 
|-
| Win
| align=center| 12–8
| Ross Mason
| Submission (heel hook)
| Cage Rage 19
| 
| align=center| 1
| align=center| 2:55
| England
| 
|-
| Win
| align=center| 11–8
| Lee Doski
| TKO (corner stoppage)
| Cage Rage Contenders 2
| 
| align=center| 2
| align=center| 5:00
| London, England
| 
|-
| Win
| align=center| 10–8
| Paul Jenkins
| KO (punch)
| ZT: Fight Night
| 
| align=center| 1
| align=center| 4:05
| England
| 
|-
| Loss
| align=center| 9–8
| Hidetaka Monma
| Submission (armbar)
| GCM: D.O.G. 3
| 
| align=center| 1
| align=center| 2:14
| Tokyo, Japan
| 
|-
| Loss
| align=center| 9–7
| Abdul Mohamed
| TKO (doctor stoppage)
| Cage Rage 11
| 
| align=center| 1
| align=center| 5:00
| England
| 
|-
| Win
| align=center| 9–6
| Mike Tomson
| Submission (ankle lock)
| Shoot-Fighting FC
| 
| align=center| 1
| align=center| 0:13
| England
| 
|-
| Win
| align=center| 8–6
| Andy Walker
| Submission (heel hook)
| P & G: Clash in Consett 4
| 
| align=center| 1
| align=center| 2:09
| England
| 
|-
| Loss
| align=center| 7–6
| Paul Daley
| TKO (doctor stoppage)
| Cage Rage 9
| 
| align=center| 1
| align=center| 5:00
| England
| 
|-
| Loss
| align=center| 7–5
| Matt Ewin
| TKO (doctor stoppage)
| Cage Rage 7
| 
| align=center| 2
| align=center| 3:42
| England
| 
|-
| Loss
| align=center| 7–4
| Shonie Carter
| Decision (unanimous)
| Cage Wars
| 
| align=center| 3
| align=center| 5:00
| Ireland
|Return to Welterweight.
|-
| Loss
| align=center| 7–3
| Paul Taylor
| Decision (unanimous)
| Cage Rage 2
| 
| align=center| 3
| align=center| 5:00
| England
|Lightweight debut.
|-
| Win
| align=center| 7–2
| Shain Tovell
| Submission (heel hook)
| UZI 1: Cage Combat Evolution
| 
| align=center| 1
| align=center| 0:56
| England
| 
|-
| Loss
| align=center| 6–2
| Joey Guel
| TKO (corner stoppage)
| KOTC 15: Bad Intentions
| 
| align=center| 1
| align=center| 2:31
| California, United States
| 
|-
| Loss
| align=center| 6–1
| Marcos da Silva
| TKO (doctor stoppage)
| Cage Wars 2
| 
| align=center| 1
| align=center| 5:00
| England
| 
|-
| Win
| align=center| 6–0
| Paul Seney
| Submission (punches)
| Vale Tudo FC
| 
| align=center| 2
| align=center| N/A
| England
| 
|-
| Win
| align=center| 5–0
| Rob Miller
| Submission (triangle choke)
| UKMMAC 1: Sudden Impact
| 
| align=center| 1
| align=center| 1:03
| England
| 
|-
| Win
| align=center| 4–0
| Dave Ives
| Submission (toe hold)
| KSBO: International
| 
| align=center| 1
| align=center| N/A
| England
| 
|-
| Win
| align=center| 3–0
| Guy Stainthorp
| Submission (triangle choke)
| KSBO: International
| 
| align=center| 1
| align=center| N/A
| England
| 
|-
| Win
| align=center| 2–0
| Chris Collins
| Submission (armlock)
| Hasdell Competition
| 
| align=center| 1
| align=center| 0:58
| England
| 
|-
| Win
| align=center| 1–0
| Moise Rimbon
| Decision (1–0 points)
| Pancrase: Pancrase UK
| 
| align=center| N/A
| align=center| N/A
| England
|

References

External links
 
 
 Official Facebook

1973 births
French male film actors
French male karateka
French male kickboxers
French male mixed martial artists
French Muay Thai practitioners
French sambo practitioners
French practitioners of Brazilian jiu-jitsu
Lightweight mixed martial artists
Mixed martial artists utilizing Muay Thai
Mixed martial artists utilizing karate
Mixed martial artists utilizing shootboxing
Mixed martial artists utilizing sambo
Mixed martial artists utilizing Brazilian jiu-jitsu
Living people
People from Évry, Essonne
Welterweight kickboxers
Welterweight mixed martial artists
Sportspeople from Essonne
Ultimate Fighting Championship male fighters